Dawn Danielle Gile (born January 1, 1980) is an American politician and attorney. She is a member of the Maryland Senate for District 33 in Anne Arundel County, Maryland.

Background
Gile graduated from Rockford University with a Bachelor of Arts degree in psychology and a minor in French before getting her Juris Doctor degree from Loyola University Chicago School of Law in 2006. She worked in the Chicago area before moving to Maryland in 2007. Before becoming a state senator, she served as the president of the Military Spouse JD Network.

In July 2021, Gile filed to run for the Maryland Senate in District 33, seeking to succeed retiring state senator Edward R. Reilly. She won the Democratic primary unopposed, and faced Republican state delegate Sid Saab in the general election. During her campaign, she received endorsements from President of the Maryland Senate Bill Ferguson, former U.S. Senate candidate Amy McGrath, and former Deputy Secretary of the Maryland Department of Housing Ardath Cade.

In October 2022, Saab filed a $2 million defamation lawsuit against Gile, alleging that some of her campaign literature contained false information about him and his business, including the suggestion that he is under federal indictment. He also accused Gile of intentionally darkening his face to make him look like "a sinister minority." Gile, in a statement to Maryland Matters, called Saab's lawsuit a "distraction and a misuse of the legal system" and implied that his allegations were an act of desperation. Saab dropped the lawsuits once the election was over.

Gile defeated Saab in the general election on November 8, 2022, receiving 55.41 percent of the vote to Saab's 44.48 percent. She is the first Democrat to win the state Senate seat in 50 years and the first Democrat to hold the office since Robert R. Neall.

In the legislature
Gile was sworn into the Maryland Senate on January 11, 2023. She is a member of the Finance Committee.

Personal life
Gile is a military spouse, with her husband, D.J. Gile, serving in the military for 23 years. Together, they have three daughters and live in Severna Park, Maryland.

Political positions
Gile has been described as a moderate.

Education
Gile supports the Blueprint for Maryland's Future, a sweeping education reform bill passed by the legislature during the 2020 legislative session that would provide schools with $3.8 billion a year for 10 years. In January 2022, she called the Blueprint bill a "wonderful piece of legislation" but said that it did not address all the issues facing students and staff in public schools.

Environment
Gile supports efforts to clean up pollution and runoff in the Chesapeake Bay and the Severn River. In January 2022, she said she supports smart development and sustainable agricultural practices to protect local ecosystems, specifically adding that she supports providing farmers with support to reduce nitrogen and phosphorus runoff from chicken farms.

Social issues
During her state senate campaign, Gile sought to capitalize on the issue of abortion rights following the Supreme Court's decision in Dobbs v. Jackson Women's Health Organization.

Taxes
Gile supports closing loopholes in Maryland's tax code. She also supports making military retiree pay exempt from state taxes.

Electoral history

References

External links
 

1980 births
21st-century American politicians
21st-century American women politicians
Democratic Party Maryland state senators
Living people
Rockford University alumni
Women state legislators in Maryland
People from Severna Park, Maryland
People from Dubuque, Iowa
Maryland lawyers